Toofan is a 1976 Pakistani Punjabi film directed and produced by Hassan Askari. The film starred Aasia, Sultan Rahi, Iqbal Hassan, Najma, Afzaal Ahmad, and Mustafa Qureshi. Toofan was a super hit movie and won 3 Nigar Awards, including the best film for the year.

Plot
The main character of the story is a retired soldier who walks with a limp but takes revenge on his enemies.

Cast
 Asiya
 Sultan Rahi
 Iqbal Hassan
 Najma
 Afzaal Ahmad
 Mustafa Qureshi
 Bahar
 Saiqa
 Khalid Saleem Mota
 Jaggi Malik

Release and box office
Toofan was released on 9 April 1976. It was crowned as a golden jubilee hit.

Music and soundtracks
The music was composed by Safdar Hussain and lyrics were penned by Waris Ludhyanvi:

 Agg Lag Jandi Jithun Langdi... Singer: Mehdi Hassan

Awards

References

1976 films
1970s Punjabi-language films
Pakistani action films
Punjabi-language Pakistani films
Nigar Award winners